Ab Darreh (also Romanized as Āb Darreh) is a village in Hesar-e Valiyeasr Rural District, Central District, Avaj County, Qazvin Province, Iran. At the 2006 census, its population was 94, in 29 families. Ab Darreh suffered severely in the 2002 Bou'in-Zahra earthquake.

References 

Populated places in Avaj County